Hussain Ahmed (1932 – 16 April 2021) was an Indian footballer. He competed in the men's tournament at the 1956 Summer Olympics. He played for the Hyderabad City Police team in the 1950s, as well as taking part at the 1958 Asian Games and the Merdeka Tournament in 1959.

Hussain began his journey with Osmania University football team that won all India inter-varsity title in 1954. He represented Hyderabad in Santosh Trophy for three consecutive years. He died from COVID-19 on 16 April 2021.

Club career
Hussain Ahmed began his club football with Hyderabad City Police FC, one of the strongest sides in Indian football.

Hussain was part of Hyderabad's golden generation of players which turned the spotlight on itself by winning the 1956 Santosh Trophy in Trivandrum. He played as a central defender.

He later moved to Kolkata and captained Mohammedan Sporting for over a decade and created history when his side became the first Indian team to win the Aga Khan Gold Cup in Dhaka in 1960. Hussain also won the Rovers Cup with Mohammedan in 1959.

Born in 1932, he started his career with Hyderabad Police under the legendary coach Syed Abdul Rahim. He later moved to Kolkata in 1957 where he played for Mohammedan Sporting Club for over a decade.

International career
Hussain was a part of the golden era of India national football team in the 1950s. India won the gold medal in the 1951 Asian Games and finished fourth in the 1956 Olympic Games. A product of Nizam College, Hyderabad, Hussain was a tenacious defender known for tight marking and hard tackling.

He was a member of the 1956 Melbourne Olympics Indian football team, that reached the semi-finals. He also took part in the 1958 Asian Games in Tokyo, Japan. Ahmed Hussain made his debut against Bulgaria on 7 December 1956 and went on to make 11 appearances for India.

His teammates under coach Syed Abdul Rahim at th 1956 Melbourne Olympics and 1958 Tokyo Asian Games were like: Peter Thangaraj, Nikhil Nandy, Samar Banerjee, P. K. Banerjee, Kesto Pal, Neville Stephen D'Souza, Tulsidas Balaram, Abdul Latif, Mariappa Kempiah, Chuni Goswami, Kannan, Mohammed Rahmatullah.

Ahmed also appeared with the Indian team that finished as runners-up at the 1959 Merdeka Tournament.

Coaching career

Apart from his display in the 1956 Olympics when India finished fourth, Hussein Saab has contributed immensely as a coach with Sports Authority of India in Bangalore. In 2009, Hussaen along with compatriots of the 1956 Melbourne Olympics, were felicitated by the sports minister M. S. Gill in honour of their achievements.

Honours
Osmania University
All-India Inter-University championship: 1954

Mohammedan Sporting
 Calcutta Football League: 1957
 IFA Shield: 1957
 Aga Khan Gold Cup: 1960
 Rovers Cup: 1955, 1957, 1958
 Durand Cup: runner-up 1959

India
Merdeka Tournament runner-up: 1959

References

Bibliography

External links
 

1932 births
2021 deaths
Footballers from Hyderabad, India
Indian footballers
India international footballers
Olympic footballers of India
Footballers at the 1956 Summer Olympics
Association football midfielders
Deaths from the COVID-19 pandemic in India
Mohammedan SC (Kolkata) players
Calcutta Football League players
Footballers at the 1958 Asian Games
Asian Games competitors for India